Virtual earth may refer to:

 Virtual ground - a node of an electrical circuit that is maintained at a steady reference potential, without being connected directly to the reference potential.
 Microsoft Virtual Earth - a technology framework used in interactive online mapping applications such as Live Search Maps.